Goosefishes are anglerfishes in the family Lophiidae found in the Arctic, Atlantic, Indian, and Pacific Oceans, where they live on sandy and muddy bottoms of the continental shelf and continental slope, to depths of more than . Like most other anglerfishes, they have a very large head with a large mouth that bears long, sharp, recurved teeth. Also like other anglerfishes, the first spine of the spinous dorsal fin has been modified as an angling apparatus (illicium) that bears a bulb-like or fleshy lure (esca). 

The angling apparatus is located at the tip of the snout just above the mouth and is used to attract prey. Lophiid anglerfishes also have two or three other dorsal fin spines located more posteriorly on the head, and a separate spinous dorsal fin with one to three spines located more posteriorly on the body just in front of the soft dorsal fin. In the more primitive anglerfish genera (Sladenia and Lophiodes), the gill opening extends partially in front of the elongated pectoral fin base. In the derived lophiid genera (Lophiomus and Lophius), and all other anglerfishes, the gill opening does not extend in front of the pectoral fin base. The largest individuals may exceed  in length.

Several of the large species in the genus Lophius, commonly known as monkfishes in northern Europe, are important commercially fished species. The liver of monkfish, known as ankimo, is considered a delicacy in Japan.

Fossil species
 Genus Eosladenia
 Eosladenia caucasica Bannikov, 2004
 Genus Sharfia
 Sharfia mirabilis Pietsch & Carnevale, 2011

References 

Taxa named by Constantine Samuel Rafinesque